Stern v. Marshall, 564 U.S. 462 (2011), was a United States Supreme Court case in which the Court held that a bankruptcy court, as a non-Article III court (i.e. courts without full judicial independence) lacked constitutional authority under Article III of the United States Constitution to enter a final judgment on a state law counterclaim that is not resolved in the process of ruling on a creditor's proof of claim, even though Congress purported to grant such statutory authority under . The case drew an unusual amount of interest because the petitioner was the estate of former Playboy Playmate and celebrity Anna Nicole Smith (whose legal name was Vickie Lynn Marshall).  Smith died in 2007, long before the Court ultimately decided the case, which her estate lost.

Background 
Playboy Playmate and celebrity Anna Nicole Smith married wealthy 89-year-old oil magnate J. Howard Marshall, and he died 14 months later, in 1995. When it appeared she had been excluded from his estate, she sued in Texas state probate court, sparking a long and acrimonious series of litigations between herself and Marshall's son E. Pierce Marshall. At one point, a federal district court determined that Smith was owed $88 million from the estate, while the state probate court determined that she was not owed any such substantial sum. The U.S. Supreme Court determined that the federal district court had jurisdiction to rule on the award in Marshall v. Marshall (2006).

The case was sent back to the 9th Circuit Court of Appeals to decide other remaining issues. On March 19, 2010, the same three-judge panel found in favor of E. Pierce Marshall holding that the bankruptcy court did not have the authority to decide the case, and, because the California federal district court should not have reviewed matters previously decided in the Texas probate court, the $88 million judgment for Smith was void. Following the 9th Circuit's decision, lawyers for the estate of Anna Nicole Smith requested the appeal be heard before the entire circuit. However, on May 5, 2010, that request was denied. On September 28, 2010, the U.S. Supreme Court again agreed to hear the case.

Article III, § 1 of the Constitution vests "[t]he judicial power of the United States" in life-tenured and salary-protected judges, who are nominated by the President and confirmed by the Senate. Non-Article III bankruptcy judges may not exercise the general judicial power of the United States and therefore may not finally resolve controversies that are not within the core Article I bankruptcy power Congress relied upon in creating the current system of bankruptcy jurisdiction. In Northern Pipeline Co. v. Marathon Pipe Line Co., 458 U.S. 50 (1982), a fractured plurality of the Court held that Article I bankruptcy courts could not constitutionally hear a state law breach of contract claim when the debtor was the plaintiff. The main question presented in Stern v. Marshall was whether a bankruptcy court could constitutionally enter a final judgment on an otherwise non-core tort cause of action asserted as a compulsory counterclaim to a creditor's nondischargeability complaint and proof of claim against the debtor. When the matter came before the 9th Circuit appellate court, it rendered the District Court's decision invalid on preclusion grounds since the Bankruptcy Court's decision was non-core.

The Obama administration and the Executive Office of the United States Trustee, which wanted to expand bankruptcy jurisdiction in state law matters, instructed the United States Solicitor General to submit a brief on the side of the petitioner.

Questions presented 
Whether the Ninth Circuit opinion, which renders §157(b)(2)(C) surplusage in light of §157(b)(2)(B), contravenes Congress's intent in enacting §157(b)(2)(C).
Whether Congress may, under Articles I and III, constitutionally authorize core jurisdiction over debtors' compulsory counterclaims to proofs of claim.
Whether the Ninth Circuit misapplied Marathon and Katchen and contravened the Court's post-Marathon precedent, creating a circuit split in the process, by holding that Congress cannot constitutionally authorize non-Article III bankruptcy judges to enter final judgment on all compulsory counterclaims to proofs of claim.

Opinion of the Court 
On June 23, 2011, the United States Supreme Court issued its opinion in the case (now styled Stern v. Marshall, no. 10-179). The majority of the Court held Congress cannot constitutionally authorize non-Article III bankruptcy judges to enter a final judgment on a state law counterclaim that is not resolved in the process of ruling on a creditor’s proof of claim. The four dissenting judges were of the opinion that  such broad powers are necessary to implement legislative intent and authority under Article I and concerns about the reduced efficiency of the bankruptcy courts.

This decision effectively ended the case and let stand the decision that Smith's estate was not entitled to the money that had previously been awarded to her.

Broader context
The length of the proceedings led the Chief Justice to compare it to the infamous fictional lawsuit Jarndyce v. Jarndyce in Charles Dickens's novel Bleak House, which dragged on for over a century and brought nothing but ruin to the parties. This dispute started around 1996, E. Pierce Marshall died in 2006 about a month after the Marshall v. Marshall decision, and Anna Nicole Smith died in 2007.  This did not stop the litigation though, as E. Pierce Marshall's widow Elaine and Smith's executor Howard K. Stern (not to be confused with the radio personality) continued fighting. Stern v. Marshall finally ruled against Smith's estate. However, as of 2017, some more of J. Howard Marshall's heirs are still arguing the estate in probate court, 22 years after his death, prompting the presiding judge to recuse himself from exhaustion with the case.

See also
Justice delayed is justice denied

References

External links 
 

 Supreme Court Case 

United States Constitution Article Three case law
United States Supreme Court cases
United States Supreme Court cases of the Roberts Court
United States bankruptcy case law
2011 in United States case law
Good Behavior Clause case law
Marshall family
Anna Nicole Smith